Nur Aqilah Afiqah Bte Andin Agustino Saman also simply known as Nur Aqilah Andin (born 14 March 1996) is a Singaporean netball player and current vice captain of the Singapore national team who plays in the positions of goal keeper, goal defense or wing defense. She was part of the Singaporean squad at the 2019 Netball World Cup, which was also her first World Cup appearance.

Aqilah was part of the victorious Singaporean squad during the 2014 Asian Netball Championships and was also a member of the Singaporean contingent which bagged silver at the 2017 Southeast Asian Games.

In September 2019, she was included in the Singaporean squad for the 2019 M1 Nations Cup and was part of the national team which emerged as runners-up to Namibia in the final.

References 

1996 births
Living people
Singaporean netball players
Southeast Asian Games silver medalists for Singapore
Southeast Asian Games medalists in netball
Competitors at the 2017 Southeast Asian Games
Competitors at the 2019 Southeast Asian Games
2019 Netball World Cup players
21st-century Singaporean women